Justice Gould may refer to:

Andrew Gould (judge), associate justice of the Arizona Supreme Court
Ashley Mulgrave Gould, associate justice of the Supreme Court of the District of Columbia
James Gould (jurist), associate justice of the Connecticut Supreme Court
Robert S. Gould, associate justice and chief justice of the Texas Supreme Court
Steven B. Gould (born 1966), justice of the Maryland Supreme Court

See also
Ronald M. Gould (born 1946), judge of the United States Court of Appeals for the Ninth Circuit